Noah Hyatt Virgin (December 6, 1812December 7, 1892) was an American grain merchant, politician, and Wisconsin pioneer.  He was an early settler at Platteville, Wisconsin, and represented Grant County in the Wisconsin State Senate (1858–1862), State Assembly (1848, 1855), and the Territorial Assembly (prior to statehood).

Biography
Virgin was born on December 6, 1812, in Fayette County, Pennsylvania. He moved to Platteville, Wisconsin in 1835. In 1839, he married Pamelia E. Adams. They had eight children, including Horatio Hyatt Virgin (1840–1913), who became a colonel in the Union Army during the American Civil War.

Career
Virgin was Commissioner of Grant County, Wisconsin, and a member of the Wisconsin Territorial Legislature. He was a member of the Assembly in 1848 and 1855 and served two consecutive terms in the Senate. In 1857, he was appointed to the new state Board of Regents for Normal Schools.

Originally a member of the Whig Party, Virgin was a Republican from 1854 until the re-election of Abraham Lincoln in 1864. Virgin later became a member of the Democratic Party. In 1866, he was a candidate for the United States House of Representatives from Wisconsin's 3rd congressional district. He lost to incumbent Amasa Cobb. He died on December 7, 1892 in Racine, Wisconsin.

References

1812 births
1892 deaths
Businesspeople from Wisconsin
American horticulture businesspeople
People from Fayette County, Pennsylvania
People from Platteville, Wisconsin
Republican Party Wisconsin state senators
Members of the Wisconsin Territorial Legislature
19th-century American politicians
Millers
Wisconsin Whigs
Millwrights
19th-century American businesspeople
Democratic Party members of the Wisconsin State Assembly
Republican Party members of the Wisconsin State Assembly